The Central District of Mahvelat County is a district (bakhsh) in Mahvelat County, Razavi Khorasan province, Iran. At the 2006 census, its population was 31,211, in 8,039 families.  The district has one city: Feyzabad. The district has two rural districts (dehestan): Howmeh Rural District and Mahvelat-e Jonubi Rural District.

References 

Districts of Razavi Khorasan Province
Mahvelat County